An interception, also known as a pick/INT is a gridiron football concept involving a pass being caught by an opposition player, who usually gains possession for his team. Record-keeping for interception counts in the National Football League (NFL) began in 1940. The record for most interceptions in a single season is held by Night Train Lane, who logged 14 interceptions in 1952, while playing for the Los Angeles Rams. Previously Dan Sandifer of Washington, Spec Sanders and Lester Hayes 
jointly held the record, earning 13 interceptions, in 1948 and 1980, respectively. The record for most league-leading seasons in interceptions is 3. This was first achieved by Everson Walls, who led the league in interceptions in 1981, 1982, and again in 1985. Ed Reed was later able to match Walls, by leading the league in 2004, 2008, and 2010. Bill Bradley became the first player to lead the league in interceptions in consecutive seasons (1971 and 1972). The aforementioned Walls matched Bradley with his 1981 and 1982 efforts. The most recent players to lead the league in interceptions was a tie between four players Minkah Fitzpatrick, C. J. Gardner-Johnson, Justin Simmons and Tariq Woolen who all finished with 6 on the season. Additionally, New York Giants players have led the league in interceptions in more seasons (7) than any other team, but it has not happened  since 1968.

Interception leaders

Other leagues
All-America Football Conference (AAFC):

American Football League (AFL):

See also
 List of National Football League career interceptions leaders
 List of National Football League annual forced fumbles leaders
 List of National Football League annual sacks leaders

References

Interceptions leaders, annual
National Football League lists